In mathematics, the Siegel upper half-space of degree g (or genus g) (also called the Siegel upper half-plane) is the set of g × g symmetric matrices over the complex numbers whose imaginary part is positive definite. It is the symmetric space associated to the symplectic group .

The Siegel upper half-space has properties as a complex manifold that generalize the properties of the upper half-plane, which is the Siegel upper half-space in the special case g=1. The group of automorphisms preserving the complex structure of the manifold is isomorphic to the symplectic group . Writing a generic matrix Z in the Siegel upper half-space in terms of its real and imaginary parts as Z = X + iY, all metrics with isometry group  are proportional to

See also

Siegel domain, a generalization  of the Siegel upper half space
Siegel modular form, a type of automorphic form defined on the Siegel upper half-space
Siegel modular variety, a moduli space constructed as a quotient of the Siegel upper half-space
Moduli of abelian varieties

References

.  

Complex analysis
Automorphic forms
Differential geometry
1939 introductions